Windows Server (formerly Windows NT Server) is a group of operating systems (OS) for servers that Microsoft has been developing since July 27, 1993. The first OS that was released for this platform is Windows NT 3.1 Advanced Server. With the release of Windows Server 2003, the brand name was changed to Windows Server.

Microsoft's history of developing operating systems for servers goes back to Windows NT 3.1 Advanced Server. Windows 2000 Server is the first OS to include Active Directory, DNS Server, DHCP Server, and Group Policy.

Members

Main releases 
Main releases include:
Windows Server 2022 (August 2021)
Windows Server 2019 (October 2018)
Windows Server 2016 (October 2016)
Windows Server 2012 R2 (October 2013)
Windows Server 2012 (September 2012)
Windows Server 2008 R2 (October 2009)
Windows Server 2008 (February 2008)
Windows Server 2003 R2 (December 2005)
Windows Server 2003 (April 2003)
Windows 2000 Server (December 1999)
Windows NT 4.0 Server (July 1996)
Windows NT Server 3.51 (May 1995)
Windows NT Server 3.5 (September 1994)
Windows NT 3.1 Advanced Server (July 1993)

Traditionally, Microsoft supports Windows Server for 10 years, with five years of mainstream support and an additional five years of extended support. These releases also offer a complete desktop experience. Starting with Windows Server 2008 R2, Server Core and Nano Server configurations were made available to reduce the OS footprint. Between 2015 and 2021, Microsoft referred to these releases as "long-term support" releases to set them apart from semi-annual releases (see below.)

For sixteen years, Microsoft released a major version of Windows Server every four years, with one minor version released two years after a major release. The minor versions had an "R2" suffix in their names. In October 2018, Microsoft broke this tradition with the release of Windows Server 2019, which should have been "Windows Server 2016 R2". Windows Server 2022 is also a minor upgrade over its predecessor.

Branded releases 
Certain editions of Windows Server have a customized name:

Windows Storage Server (editions of Windows Server 2003 through 2016; editions of Windows Server IoT 2019 and its successors)
Windows HPC Server 2008
Windows HPC Server 2008 R2
Windows Home Server (an edition of Windows Server 2003)
Windows Home Server 2011 (an edition of Windows Server 2008 R2)
Hyper-V Server (a discontinued, freeware edition of Windows Server 2008 through 2019)
Windows MultiPoint Server
Windows Server Essentials
Windows Essential Business Server (discontinued)
Azure Stack HCI (an edition of Windows Server 2019 and later)

Semi-annual releases (discontinued) 
Following the release of Windows Server 2016, Microsoft attempted to mirror the lifecycle of Windows 10 in the Windows Server family, releasing new versions twice a year which were supported for 18 months. These semi-annual versions were only available as part of Microsoft subscription services, including Software Assurance, Azure Marketplace, and Microsoft Visual Studio subscriptions, until their discontinuation in July 2021.

The semi-annual releases do not include any desktop environments. Instead, they are restricted to the Nano Server configuration installed in a Docker container, and the Server Core configuration, licensed only to serve as a container host.

Semi-annual releases include:
Windows Server, version 20H2 (unsupported as of )
Windows Server, version 2004 (unsupported as of )
Windows Server, version 1909 (unsupported as of )
Windows Server, version 1903 (unsupported as of )
Windows Server, version 1809 (unsupported as of )
Windows Server, version 1803 (unsupported as of )
Windows Server, version 1709 (unsupported as of )

See also 
List of Microsoft Windows versions
Microsoft Servers

NetWare
Open Enterprise Server

References

External links 

Windows Server
Windows NT